Orgiano is a town in the province of Vicenza, Veneto, northern Italy. It is located east of SP500 provincial road. Sights include the Villa Fracanzan Piovene, a late Baroque-Neoclassicist patrician villa designed by Francesco Antonio Muttoni (1710).

References

External links
(Google Maps)

Cities and towns in Veneto